Alan White (born 22 March 1976) is an English former professional footballer who made more than 400 appearances in the Football League.

Career
Born in Darlington, County Durham, White began his career as a trainee at Middlesbrough in 1995, but his only first-team appearance came in the Anglo-Italian Cup. He joined Luton Town in September 1997 for a fee of £40,000, and made over 80 league appearances in three seasons. He had a one-month loan spell with Colchester United in late 1999, and joined that club on a free transfer in July 2000.

White made 166 appearances for Colchester in four seasons, scoring four goals, and was voted the club's player of the year in the 2003–04 season. He rejected their offer of a new contract and instead joined Leyton Orient in June 2004 on a two-year deal. However, he was allowed to leave nine months later and joined Boston United in March 2005 on a one-year contract; Boston manager Steve Evans said he was "delighted to get Alan on board. He was outstanding for Colchester United last season and is a great competitor."

At the end of his Boston contract in June 2006, White joined Notts County on a free transfer, where he was made club captain. Nine months later, he joined Peterborough United on loan for the remainder of the 2006–07 season, and was one of six players released by Notts County at the end of the season.

White joined his hometown club Darlington on 15 May 2007. He went on to make 85 league and cup appearances. Darlington entered administration in February 2009, and White was told he would be free to leave at the end of the season. He subsequently rejoined Luton Town on a two-year contract on 8 June 2009. He played 24 games for the club before being placed on the transfer list on 12 January 2010. Three days later he rejoined Darlington on loan for the rest of the season. He made 24 appearances as Darlington were relegated from the Football League, picking up just 30 points from 46 games.

On 27 August 2010, White was released by Luton. He was picked up by Conference North club Stalybridge Celtic and made his debut against Alfreton Town on 2 October 2010. White made 8 league and cup appearances for Stalybridge before signing for Gateshead on a monthly contract on 18 November. He made his debut on 20 November in a 1–1 draw with Forest Green Rovers, and scored his first goal for them on 14 December against Southport in the FA Trophy. On 8 February 2011, Gateshead announced that they had released White.

He signed for Blyth Spartans on 11 February and made his debut four days later against Alfreton Town, scoring an own goal in a 2–1 defeat. He made 15 appearances by the end of the season, and then rejoined Boston United, then playing in the Conference North, on a non-contract basis. In mid-December, he left the club, citing the distance he had to travel from his home in Darlington, and signed for another Conference North club, Harrogate Town. He helped them gain promotion to the Conference National in 2013, but left the club in October 2013 to rejoin Darlingtonby then playing in the Northern Premier League Division One North under the name of Darlington 1883in search of regular football. He was named in the 2013–14 Northern Premier League Division One North Team of the Season, and contributed to two consecutive promotions in the next two seasons, as well as taking on some coaching duties.

In June 2016, White joined Spennymoor Town as player-coach. He remained with the club until October 2017, when he returned to Darlington as assistant to newly appointed manager Tommy Wright. When Wright left the club at the end of the 2018–19 season, White stayed on as temporary academy manager until a permanent appointment was made in mid-July.

Career statistics

References

External links

1976 births
Living people
Footballers from Darlington
English footballers
Association football defenders
Middlesbrough F.C. players
Luton Town F.C. players
Colchester United F.C. players
Leyton Orient F.C. players
Boston United F.C. players
Notts County F.C. players
Peterborough United F.C. players
Darlington F.C. players
Stalybridge Celtic F.C. players
Gateshead F.C. players
Blyth Spartans A.F.C. players
Harrogate Town A.F.C. players
Spennymoor Town F.C. players
English Football League players
National League (English football) players
Northern Premier League players